Alexandru Fritz (17 April 1905 – 3 August 1972) was a Romanian athlete. He competed in the men's shot put at the 1928 Summer Olympics.

References

External links
 

1905 births
1972 deaths
Athletes (track and field) at the 1928 Summer Olympics
Romanian male shot putters
Olympic athletes of Romania
Place of birth missing